Podocinella is a genus of mites in the family Podocinidae.

References

Mesostigmata
Articles created by Qbugbot